The 1999 European Figure Skating Championships were an international figure skating competition in the 1998–99 season. Elite senior-level figure skaters from European ISU member nations competed for the title of European Champion. Skaters competed in the disciplines of men's singles, ladies' singles, pair skating, and ice dancing. The corresponding competition for non-European skaters was the 1999 Four Continents Figure Skating Championships.

In 1999, the European Championships were held at the Prague Sports Hall in Prague, Czech Republic from January 24 through 31, 1999. Due to the large number of participants, the men's and ladies' qualifying groups were split into groups A and B.

Medals table

Results

Men

Ladies

Pairs
Berezhnaya / Sikharulidze withdrew due to the flu.

Ice dancing

References

European Figure Skating Championships, 1999
European Figure Skating Championships, 1999
European Figure Skating Championships
Sports competitions in Prague
European 1999
1990s in Prague
European Figure Skating Championships